Quiéreme Tonto is a Mexican telenovela by TV Azteca, apparently a remake of Bésame Tonto, which has the same author.   It premiered on April 19, 2010. This will be the third telenovela of the new era of Azteca Novelas.It stars Yahir and Litzy. It has some connection  with TV Azteca and  the ex-La Academia Giovanna, the winner of the seventh generation.  It has the participation of Andrea Escalona antagonistic and actors Dulce and Ariel López Padilla.

Cast

Main cast

Prime actors
Sergio Bustamante
Sergio Kleiner as Dimas Romeo
Dulce as Ximena Dorelli
Ariel López Padilla as Lázaro Cruz

Secondary cast
Andrea Escalona as Nallely
Matías Novoa as Juan Diego Cruz
Raúl Sandoval
Giovannita (Cantante) as Clarita Romeo
José Joel
Cynthia
Eugenio Montesoro
Mayra Rojas como Engracia
Nubia Martí as Asuncion
Wendy Braga as Lolita
Eva Prado as Engracia
Carlos Torres como Gonzalo Romeo
Kenia Gazcon
Alberto Casanova como David Dorelli
Irene Arcila
Francisco Angelini as Miguel Dorelli
Guillermo Iván as Antonio
Alexandra Rodriguez as Diana
Danny Gamba as Cory
Laura Palma as Laura
Cristobal Orellana as Ivan
Agustin Arguello as Agustin
Matias Aranda as Matias
Manuel "Menny" Carrasco as Menny
Oscar Jimenez as Oscar
Sebastian Martingaste as Sebastian

References

2010 telenovelas
2010 Mexican television series debuts
2010 Mexican television series endings
Mexican telenovelas
TV Azteca telenovelas
Mexican television series based on Venezuelan television series
Spanish-language telenovelas